Janq'u Qalani (Aymara janq'u white, qala stone, -ni a suffix to indicate ownership, "the one with a white stone", also spelled Janco Khalani, Jankho Khalani) is a  mountain in the Cordillera Real in the Bolivian Andes. It lies in the La Paz Department, Murillo Province, Palca Municipality. Janq'u Qalani is situated southwest of Mururata, Qutapata, Churu and Wila Quta.

References 

Mountains of La Paz Department (Bolivia)